The Birthday Party is a 1980 album by Australian rock band The Boys Next Door (later reissued under the band name The Birthday Party). The album was produced by The Boys Next Door, Tony Cohen, and Keith Glass; it was recorded with Cohen engineering at Richmond Recorders Studios in Melbourne from July 1979 to February 1980.

The album was vastly different from the new-wave pop-punk style of their debut Door, Door (released the year earlier), moving towards the dark and chaotic post punk style they would later become known for (as The Birthday Party). This album was both the final album by The Boys Next Door and the first full-length release by The Birthday Party. In its original release, it was credited to both, but on its first reissue, it was credited to The Birthday Party.

The album in its entirety has been reissued on CD as part of the Hee Haw compilation along with the Hee Haw EP.

Tracy Pew was absent from the recording session for "Mr. Clarinet", so he recorded the bass later. Two of the album's songs, "The Red Clock" and "The Hair Shirt" were originally included on the Hee Haw EP, released in 1979.

Track listing

References

The Birthday Party (band) albums
1980 albums
Albums produced by Tony Cohen
4AD albums
CBS Records albums